Gresham High School is a public high school located in Gresham, Oregon, United States.

History
Gresham High School opened in 1906. There have since been several improvements to grounds and buildings, expansions, and classroom additions. In 1971, the original grandstands, made completely of wood, burned to the ground in less than 30 minutes. In 2016 the Gresham-Barlow School District and the voters of Gresham passed a bond to replace most parts of the school, with construction beginning in 2018. The project was completed in 2021. Until the recent remodel, the school still had asbestos tiling and pipe insulation throughout the building and numerous architectural faults.

Academics
Gresham High is an official International Baccalaureate school offering the IB Diploma Program.

In 2008, 81% of the school's seniors received a high school diploma. Of 450 students, 366 graduated, 45 dropped out, 15 received a modified diploma, and 24 were still in high school in 2009.

Sports

State championships
 Football: 1982
 Boys' swimming: 1992
 Boys' water polo: 1981.
 Girls' water polo: 1982, 1991
 Girls volleyball: 1986, 1988, 1989, 1990, 1991, 1994, 2001, 2002, 2006
 Speech and debate: 2009, 2010, 2011, 2012
 Oregon All High School Drag Racing: 1977
 Rhythmettes Dance Team: 1991, 1999, 2014, 2015, 2016

Activities
The Theatre Arts Department offers students  opportunities ranging from acting in main stage productions, including a full length musical, to directing or working as crew members backstage. Students work with theatre professionals throughout the Portland area, including a residency with Portland Center Stage, and working with influential organist Martin Ellis.

The choir program consists of Encore Choir, Gresham Men's Choir, Treble Choir, Concert Choir, and Overtones. For five years in a row, the Gresham High School Concert Choir placed in the top five in the OSAA State Choir Competition. 
 
The Gresham High School Band program consists of Jazz Band, Concert Band, Symphonic Band, Wind Symphony, Pep Band, and Pit Orchestra. The first Gresham High School Band was in 1926.

Although the Gresham Barlow School District cut millions of dollars from the budget for the 2009/2010 school year, the band and choir programs were able to continue at Gresham High School because of peaceful student protests through song.

Publications 

Gresham High School produces two newspapers: The Gresham Argus and The Gopher Gazette. They are produced by separate staffs and are budgeted by their own advertising efforts. The newspapers have different audiences as well; the Gresham Argus is delivered to students in class, and the Gopher Gazette is distributed via postal mail to parents of students and businesses in the community. The Gopher Gazette recently lost funding and had to switch to an online format.

Notable alumni
 Laurie Monnes Anderson (1964), politician, Oregon State Senator representing East Multnomah County
 Anne Schedeen (1967), actress
 Bob Schloredt (1959), professional quarterback and College Football Hall of Fame member
 Sam Crouser

References

High schools in Multnomah County, Oregon
Education in Gresham, Oregon
International Baccalaureate schools in Oregon
Educational institutions established in 1906
Public high schools in Oregon
Buildings and structures in Gresham, Oregon
1906 establishments in Oregon